Oulder Hill Leadership Academy (formerly Oulder Hill Community School) is a co-educational secondary school for 11- to 16-year-olds, located in Rochdale, Greater Manchester, England.

History
The school fully opened to 13–16 years in 1977, under the leadership of its first Headmaster was Dr Morris. The largest school in the Metropolitan borough of Rochdale, it taught over 1000 students. The school buildings also included the Gracie Fields theatre, a 25-metre swimming pool, tennis courts and extensive fields for football and rugby.

In 2003, the school merged with Rydings Special School, a local school for children with disabilities. The merger required a complete reconstruction of the school, which began in 2005 and finished in 2008, and involved the redevelopment of the current site as well as an entirely new building being built on the former playing fields and tennis courts. The Oulder Hill School building remains with the same name and Rydings Special School has been named Redwood Secondary school. The building is now owned by OPERON and the school pays £1 million a year to rent the school from 6 am to 6 pm.

Once a thriving part of the school, Oulder Hill's sixth form began to decline from the year 2000 onwards. The sixth form closed to new students when Rochdale Sixth Form College opened in September 2010. At the time of closure, the sixth form had about 150 students, down from over 600 when it was first established.

Previously a community school administered by Rochdale Metropolitan Borough Council, in March 2022 Oulder Hill Community School converted to academy status and was renamed Oulder Hill Leadership Academy. It is now sponsored by Star Academies.

Notable former pupils
Waterloo Road star Shannon Flynn attended the school
Singer-songwriter Lisa Stansfield attended Oulder Hill

References

External links
 Oulder Hill Leadership Academy official website

Secondary schools in the Metropolitan Borough of Rochdale
Academies in the Metropolitan Borough of Rochdale
Schools in Rochdale
Star Academies